Nicholas Shaxson (born 1966) is a British author, journalist and investigator. He is best known for his investigative books Poisoned Wells (2007) and Treasure Islands (2011). He has worked as a part-time writer and researcher for the Tax Justice Network, an expert-led lobbying group focused on the harmful impacts of tax avoidance, tax competition and tax havens.

Biography
Shaxson was born in Malawi and educated in Britain.  He has lived at various times in India, Brazil, England, Lesotho, Spain, Angola, South Africa, Germany, Switzerland, and the Netherlands. Since 1993, he has written on global business and politics for Vanity Fair, the Financial Times, Reuters, The Economist and its sister publication the Economist Intelligence Unit, International Affairs, Foreign Affairs, American Interest, the BBC, Africa Confidential, African Energy and others.

In 2011, he published Treasure Islands, one of the first in depth investigations into the world of offshore finance and financial secrecy which led him to work alongside James S Henry at the Tax Justice Network

Shaxson currently lives with his partner and their two children in Berlin.

Awards and honours
2012 Bread and Roses Award, shortlist, Treasure Islands.

See also
Tax Justice Network
Corporate tax haven
Tax haven
Ireland as a tax haven

Bibliography

References

External links
  Treasure Islands's website
 Collected articles at The Guardian
 "The City of London and its Tax Haven Empire": presentation by Nicholas Shaxson and Maurice Glasman at the LSE, 1 February 2011. Shaxson begins speaking approximately 2 min into the recording, and jointly answers questions after the 54 min mark.

1966 births
Living people
British non-fiction writers
British male writers
British business writers
People educated at Bedford Modern School
Writers on taxation
Male non-fiction writers